The Mexico City Philharmonic Orchestra is an orchestra of international rank founded and underwritten by the National Government of Mexico.  The home venue is the Silvestre Revueltas Hall at the Ollín Yoliztli Cultural Center (es) in Tlalpan, Mexico City, which opened in 1979.

History 
The Mexico City Philharmonic Orchestra was founded in 1978 by the National Government of Mexico through an initiative by Carmen Romano, wife of then President of Mexico, José López Portillo.  The Philharmonic was part of a plan to make fine arts education accessible to youths.  The government launched classical music workshops and formed professional orchestras, including the Mexico City Philharmonic Orchestra.  Fernando Lozano Rodríguez (es) was the founding conductor.  The Philharmonic's venue name, ollín yoliztli, means "life movement" or "life force" in Náhuatl.

Directors, members, and notable soloists 

Guest conductors have included Leonard Bernstein, Eduardo Mata, and Enrique Diemecke.  Guest soloists have included Martha Argerich, Narciso Yepes, Nicanor Zabaleta, Renata Scotto, Birgit Nilsson, Claudio Arrau, Janos Starker, Isaac Stern, Placido Domingo, and María Teresa Rodríguez (es).  Artistic directors are appointed by the Secretary of Culture of Mexico City.

Artistic directors
 1978–1982: Fernando Lozano Rodríguez (es)
 1983–1989: Enrique Bátiz Campbell, made 19 recordings with the Mexico City Philharmonic, as conductor
 1990–????: Luis Herrera de la Fuente
 1998–2002: Jorge Mester
 Enrique Barrios (es)
 2013–2016: José Areán, appointed Artistic Director January 2013
 2016–present: Scott Yoo, appointed Artistic Director and Chief Conductor, February 2016

Principal guest conductors
 2011–2013: José Areán, appointed Principal Guest Director June 2011

Assistant conductors
 1980–1983: Enrique Diemecke (born 1955)

Associate conductors
 1998–2002: Carlos Miguel Prieto (born 1965)

Musicians
 1978–1979: Jerome (Jerry) Ashby (1956–2007), french horn; became associate principal french horn with the New York Philharmonic in 1979
 Morris T. Kainuma (born 1959), tuba; appointed principal tuba in 1980; currently a freelance and educator in the New York City area
 John Emmanuel Godoy (1959) was appointed Principal Timpanist in 1987. During his tenure, the Mexico City Philharmonic performed four concerts with tenor Placido Domingo, including recording Lalo Schifrin's world premiere of "Cantos Aztecas". Godoy later won the Principal Timpani position with the Corpus Christi Symphony under Mstro. Giordano. In 2011 he founded the Lux Musicae Chamber group and became its Artistic Director.

Awards and critical acclaim 

The Mexico City Philharmonic Orchestra has made over a hundred recordings, most of which have been the works of Mexican composers.  The Philharmonic is reputed to be the most prolifically recorded orchestra of music by Mexican composers. In 1981, the Mexico City Philharmonic Orchestra won the Academie du Disque Francais Grand Prize for its recording of "Mexican Ballets" by Blas Galindo, José Pablo Moncayo, and Carlos Chávez.  Fernando Lozano Rodríguez (es) was the conductor.  The jury stated that the Philharmonic was the best in Latin America.

In 2001, the Mexico City Philharmonic was nominated for "Best Classical Recording" in the inaugural Latin Grammy Awards. The Mexican Union and Theater Critics Philharmonic Mexico City and Music as the best of the year, calling it "The Best Orchestra of Mexico, 2000."

Selected discography 
  Works of De Falla, Desto DC 7216 (1982); 
 Fernando Lozano (es), conductor

 Classical Music of Mexico, Desto DC 7218 (1982); 
 Fernando Lozano (es), conductor

 Music of Revueltas, Desto DC 7215 (1982); 
 Fernando Lozano (es), conductor

 Gabriel Fauré, Musical Heritage Society (1991); 
 Recorded in 1989 at the Nezahualcóyotl Concert Hall (es), Mexico City
 Concerto, for Violin and Orchestra (world premier recording)
 Berceuse, for violin and orchestra, Op. 16 (}
 Elegie, for cello and orchestra Op. 24
 Overture, from Masques et Bergamasques, Op. 112
 Nocturne, from Shylock, Op. 57
 Pelléas et Mélisande: Suite, Op. 80
 Rodolfo Bonucci, violin (grandson of the Italian cellist, Arturo Bonucci (1894–1964) (it); Viocheslav Ponomarev (1950–2009), cello; Enrique Bátiz, conductor

 Salute to Democracy, EMI Classics CDC 7 54539 2 (1992); 
 Fanfare for the Common Man
 Lincoln Portrait
 Enrique Bátiz, conductor

References 
Inline citations

Musical groups established in 1978
Symphony orchestras